Ryan Horvat (born February 9, 1993) is a Canadian ice hockey left wing who last played for the Nottingham Panthers of the Elite Ice Hockey League (EIHL).

Playing career

Major junior
Horvat was drafted 111th overall by Guelph Storm in the 2009 Ontario Hockey League Priority Selection. He started the 2009–10 season with the Listowel Cyclones but was called up to the OHL in January 2010. Horvat was called up again the following season but was not a consistent member of Storm's line-up until the 2011–12 season. At the conclusion of the 2012–13 season, Horvat was nominated for the Roger Neilson Memorial Award as the post-secondary player in the OHL with the best grades. He was awarded the Mike Kelly Humanitarian Award, and the Fay Scott Memorial Award for his community service and academic achievements. The following season, Horvat was awarded the Winmar Community Hero Award by the team. In his final year of major junior hockey, Horvat helped guide Guelph Storm to the J. Ross Robertson Cup, beating North Bay Battalion 4–3. They lost the 2014 Memorial Cup Finals to the Edmonton Oil Kings 6–4.

Professional
Horvat signed his first professional contract with the Manchester Monarchs in the American Hockey League (AHL) on August 22, 2014. He helped guide the Monarch to a Calder Cup, the only Calder Cup the Monarchs ever won as the team relocated to Ontario, California the following season. Horvat rejoined the Monarchs, renamed the Ontario Reign, before the 2015–16 season.

Horvat joined the Springfield Thunderbirds for the 2016–17 season and signed a one way contract with the Thunderbirds on June 8, 2017. On November 15, Horvat was taken out of the Thunderbirds line-up due to a lingering shoulder injury. He returned to the ice on December 15 to help lead the Thunderbirds past the Bridgeport Sound Tigers.

Following training camp, Horvat joined the Wilkes-Barre/Scranton Penguins for the 2018–19 season. After appearing in just 6 games with the Penguins through November, Horvat was released from his try-out and returned to former club, the Springfield Thunderbirds on November 21, 2018. He remained with the club for the remainder of the season, notching 10 points in 41 regular season games.

As a free agent in the off-season, Horvat was signed to an ECHL contract with the Greenville Swamp Rabbits on September 17, 2019. Prior to the 2019–20 season, Horvat was added to the defending champion's Charlotte Checkers roster on a professional try-out on October 3, 2019. He appeared in 7 games with the Checkers, registering 1 assist before he was released from his PTO on November 8, 2019.

On December 2, it was announced that Horvat had signed with the Nottingham Panthers of the EIHL, marking Horvat's first contract outside of North America.

Personal life
Horvat studied policing at the University of Guelph while playing with Guelph Storm. His father, Zonk, is in law enforcement.

Career statistics

Awards and honours

References

External links

1993 births
Living people
Canadian ice hockey left wingers
Charlotte Checkers (2010–) players
Guelph Storm players
Manchester Monarchs (AHL) players
Nottingham Panthers players
Ontario Reign (AHL) players
Springfield Thunderbirds players
Wilkes-Barre/Scranton Penguins players
Ice hockey people from Ontario